Hælos (frequently stylized as HÆLOS, and sometimes as Haelos or HAELOS) are a British trip hop band from London.

Hælos's first single, "Dust" was released in 2014, and the group followed in 2015 with the singles "Pray" and "Earth Not Above". After signing to Matador Records in 2015, they released the Earth Not Above EP, which was followed in early 2016 with a full-length entitled Full Circle. Full Circle reached number 5 on the US Billboard electronic charts and number 20 on the Heatseekers chart. Their music has been described as "dark euphoria".

In January 2019, alongside the release of Kyoto, the band announced their second album, titled Any Random Kindness, would be released on 10 May the same year.

Discography

Albums
 Full Circle (2016)
 Any Random Kindness (2019)

Extended plays
 Earth Not Above (2015)
 I'm There (2020)
 Somnum (2021)

Singles
"Dust", 2014
"Pray", 2015
"Earth Not Above", 2015
"Buried in the Sand", 2018
"Kyoto", 2019
"Boy / Girl", 2019
"End of World Party (Edit)", 2019

References

External links
 

English electronic music groups
Musical groups from London
English indie rock groups
Matador Records artists
Trip hop groups